Deedar is a 1992 Hindi romantic action movie directed by Pramod Chakravorty and starring Akshay Kumar, Karishma Kapoor, Anupam Kher, Laxmikant Berde, Tanuja, Gurbachan Singh and Dan Dhanoa. Other cast members include Seema Deo, Ajit Vachhani, Anjana Mumtaz, Rajeev Verma, Priya Arun, Rajesh Puri and Viju Khote. This movie was supposed to be Akshay Kumar's debut movie. However, Saugandh was released first in 1991 thus becoming his debut.

Plot
Anand (Akshay Kumar) and Sapna (Karishma Kapoor) fall in love. In the past, Anand's father had back-stabbed Sapna's dad and he had gone to jail, despite being innocent. Anand plans to free Sapna's dad from prison asks his dad to confess the truth to the police. His dad realises his mistakes and seeks forgiveness from Sapna's parents and dies thereby, uniting Anand and Sapna.

Soundtrack

External links 
 

1992 films
1990s Hindi-language films
Films scored by Anand–Milind
Films directed by Pramod Chakravorty
Indian romantic drama films